Saks is a census-designated place (CDP) and Unincorporated community in Calhoun County, Alabama, United States. At the 2020 census, the population was 9,956. The community of Saks is served by the City of Anniston police and fire coverage. It is included in the Anniston-Oxford Metropolitan Statistical Area.

Geography
Saks is located southwest of the center of Calhoun County at 33°42'29.527" North, 85°50'39.574" West (33.708202, -85.844326). It is bordered by the city of Anniston to the southeast, by Alexandria to the north, and by West End-Cobb Town to the south.

Demographics

Saks first appeared on the 1970 U.S. Census as the unincorporated place of "Anniston Northwest." The name was changed to Saks effective with the 1980 census and it was made a census-designated place (CDP).

2020 census

As of the 2020 United States census, there were 9,956 people, 4,055 households, and 2,785 families residing in the CDP.

2010 census
As of the census of 2010, there were 10,744 people, 4,269 households, and 3,005 families residing in the community. The racial makeup of the community was 75.7% White, 19.4% Black or African American, 0.4% Native American, 0.8% Asian, 0.0% Pacific Islander, 1.7% from other races, and 2.0% from two or more races. 3.4% of the population were Hispanic or Latino of any race.

There were 4,286 households, out of which 26.8% had children under the age of 18 living with them, 49.4% were married couples living together, 16.0% had a female householder with no husband present, and 29.6% were non-families. 25.3% of all households were made up of individuals, and 9.9% had someone living alone who was 65 years of age or older. The average household size was 2.51 and the average family size was 2.99.

In the community, the population was spread out, with 23.4% under the age of 18, 7.8% from 18 to 24, 25.5% from 25 to 44, 27.4% from 45 to 64, and 15.9% who were 65 years of age or older. The median age was 39.8 years. For every 100 females, there were 90.8 males. For every 100 females age 18 and over, there were 92.2 males.

The median income for a household in the community was $43,955, and the median income for a family was $53,129. Males had a median income of $45,637 versus $30,774 for females. The per capita income for the CDP was $20,968. About 12.2% of families and 15.7% of the population were below the poverty line, including 19.5% of those under age 18 and 9.1% of those age 65 or over.

Education
There is an elementary school, a middle school, and a high school located within the community. These schools are administered by the Calhoun County School System. Saks High School's athletic teams (known as the Wildcats) currently compete in Class 3A of the Alabama High School Athletic Association.

References 

Unincorporated communities in Alabama
Census-designated places in Calhoun County, Alabama
Census-designated places in Alabama
Unincorporated communities in Calhoun County, Alabama